The General State Archives are the national archives of Greece. They were created in 1914 by Eleftherios Venizelos' government.

External links 
 

National archives
Government agencies of Greece
Libraries in Greece
1914 establishments in Greece
Archives in Greece
Libraries established in 1914